Normetanephrine is a metabolite of norepinephrine created by action of catechol-O-methyl transferase on norepinephrine. It is excreted in the urine and found in certain tissues. It is a marker for catecholamine-secreting tumors such as pheochromocytoma.

References

Phenol ethers
Phenylethanolamines
Tumor markers